Omar Suleiman, Omar Souleyman, or Omar Soliman (عمر سليمان) may refer to:
Omar Suleiman (imam)
Omar Suleiman (politician)
Omar Souleyman
Omar Soliman